Kullman Dining Car Company, established in Newark, New Jersey in 1927, originally manufactured diners. The company expanded and later became the Kullman Building Corporation. It relocated to Avenel and finally to Clinton Township(with corporate offices in Lebanon) and over the years production grew to include prefabricated housing, dormitories, prisons, schools, banks, equipment buildings of cellular communications towers. It also built the first pre-fabricated United States Embassy in Guinea-Bissau in West Africa. The company is known for incorporating the use of new materials, such as stainless steel and formica, as they were developed and applying technologies developed through construction of diners to other buildings and is credited with introducing the term accelerated construction
The company re-organized in bankruptcy and Kullman Industries  went out off business in 2011. XSite Modular (www.xsitemodular.com), a company formed by the management team that left prior to Kullman going out of business, now owns all the Kullman Intellectual Property purchased at auction.

Diners

There are several diners in New Jersey built by the company still in operation, notably the Tick Tock Diner in Clifton, New Jersey, the Menlo Park Diner in Edison, the Little Falls Diner in Little Falls, China 46 in Ridgefield, White Rose System diner in Roselle, and USA Country Diner in Windsor.

Poirier's Diner is on the National Register of Historic Places listings in Providence, Rhode Island. The Munson Diner, originally located on Eleventh Avenue in Manhattan was relocated in 2005 to Liberty, New York, and listed on NRHP in 2006. Sam's Diner in Kill Devil Hills, North Carolina was listed on the National Register of Historic Places in 1999.

The company, as late as the 2000, brought on line new diner designs, including one recalling the industries early affiliation with railroad cars. The Blue Comet was a named passenger train operated by Central Railroad of New Jersey from 1929 to 1941 between the Jersey City and Atlantic City.

Embassies
In 1994, Kullman built a United States embassy building at its plant in Avenel and shipped it to Bissau, Guinea-Bissau. It was the first construction of an American embassy in the US. Other embassy projects followed in Ashgabat, Turkmenistan and Bishkek, Kyrgyzstan. All were, built, shipped, and assembled by American personnel with security clearances, enabling the State Department avoid security risks sometimes encountered with on-site construction in foreign countries.

Germany
A franchise in Germany affiliated with Kullman was established in 1997, and since has opened a number of restaurants in a number of cities such as Berlin, Kaiserslautern, Ludwigsburg and Regensburg.  Called Sam Kullman's Diner, they are housed in diners built by the namesake and imported to bring the American diner experience to Germany.

See also

 List of diners

References

External links 
 Sam Kullman's Diner - Kaiserslautern
375 West Street - Manhattan
Munson Diner moves from Manhattan to Catskills
Kulman diner interior photos, floor plans, etc

Diner manufacturers
Defunct companies based in New Jersey
Companies based in Newark, New Jersey
1927 establishments in New Jersey
American companies established in 1927